Marilyn Kelly-Buccellati is an American archaeologist (married to Giorgio Buccellati), who focused her research on the Caucasus and ancient Syria in the third and second millennium B.C. (and specifically on the ancient Urkesh, the modern Tell Mozan, as well as the Kura-Araxes culture in the South Caucasus).

Academic work 
She has excavated at Nippur in Iraq, Korucutepe in Turkey, Terqa in Syria where she was co-director from 1976 to 1988.

At Urkesh/Mozan she was Director from 1983 to 2020. She organized surveys in Iraq, Syria and the Caucasus, and she has been a member of the Italian-Georgian excavations at Aradetis Orgora from 2013 to 2017 and at Lagodekhi from 2018.

Her focus has been on stratigraphy, architecture and ancient ceramics connected with sites where she has excavated. She was able to identify the use of a large ancient underground shaft excavated in Tell Mozan/Urkesh as a Hurrian ritual shaft for rituals used in communicating with the Underworld. She has written a number of publications on ancient cylinder seals and seal impression iconography

Her work on style has led her to establish criteria for the identification of what may be called Hurrian art; it has further helped define major trends in Syro-Mesopotamian art, such as the development of a new attention for realism in the rendering of the human figure. She has also  worked extensively on statistical analysis, in particular with regard to ceramic typology: she is currently   producing a  digital book on the very extensive ceramic corpus of Urkesh,.

Combining her interest in stratigraphy and iconography she worked on the many thousands of fragmented seal impressions found in the Mozan excavations so that she could determine the iconographic motifs they contained which embodied a new Hurrian style.  By connecting scenes and inscriptions on these seal impressions it was possible to identify Tell Mozan as the site of ancient Urkesh, and to describe the original seals as belonging to several kings, queens, and servants of the royal court. Urkesh is one of the oldest and largest cities of Syria, dating back to the early fourth millennium and reaching an extent of some 130 hectares in the third millennium. It was a major center of the Hurrians, important politically but especially for its religious significance. The reconstruction of the Urkesh iconography led to her research on the position and power of the royal Urkesh women and the women connected with them.

She is retired from the Art Department of California State University Los Angeles where she taught ancient art and archaeology for 30 years. Presently she is an Associated Researcher of the Cotsen Institute of Archaeology at University of California, UCLA.

Her work has been recognized in a volume of studies published in her honor, alongside her husband, Giorgio Buccellati.

Academic degrees 
 1974: PhD, University of Chicago (Oriental Institute, Chicago/The Oriental Institute): Near Eastern Languages and Civilizations
 1967: MA, University of Chicago (Oriental Institute, Chicago/The Oriental Institute): Oriental Languages and Civilizations
 1961: BA, College of St. Elizabeth, New Jersey: History

Teaching and academic positions (reverse chronological order) 
 2020–        Associated Researcher, Cotsen Institute of Archaeology, UCLA
 2013–19    Visiting Professor, Cotsen Institute of Archaeology, UCLA
 2010–12    Fellow, Cotsen Institute of Archaeology, UCLA
 2007–        Member Visiting Committee, Department of Near Eastern Art, The Metropolitan Museum of Art
 2003–10    Research Associate, Cotsen Institute of Archaeology, UCLA
 2003–        Professor Emeritus, Department of Art, California State University, Los Angeles
 1995         Visiting Scholar, Orientalisches Institut, University of Vienna (Austria)
 1994         Visiting Scholar, Facoltà di Teologia di Lugano (Switzerland)
 1993–94    Principal Advisor, Department of Art, California State University, Los Angeles
 1990–98    Chair, Art History Option, Department of Art, California State University, Los Angeles
 1983–03    Full Professor, Department of Art, California State University, Los Angeles
 1978–83    Associate Professor, Department of Art, California State University, Los Angeles
 1973–78    Assistant Professor, Department of Art, California State University, Los Angeles
 1973–        Trustee, IIMAS – The International Institute for Mesopotamian Area Studies
 1971         “Professor Invitatus,” Oriental Faculty, Pontifical Biblical Institute, Rome, Italy
 1963–66    Museum Assistant, Oriental Institute Museum, The University of Chicago
 1964–65    Teaching Assistant, Department of Near Eastern Languages and Civilizations, The University of Chicago

Archaeological field work (reverse chronological order) 
 2018–        Lagodekhi, Georgia, excavations of Ca’ Foscari University, Venice, Italy
 2013–17    Aradetis Orgora, Georgia, excavations of Ca’ Foscari University, Venice, Italy
 1983–20    Mozan/Urkesh (Director)
 1990         Shidakartli, Georgia, survey
 1976–88    Terqa (co-director)
 1974         Caucasian Republics (Georgia, Armenia and Azerbaijan): survey
 1971         Dilbat Survey, Iraq
 1968         Korucutepe, Turkey
 1966–67    Nippur, Iraq
 1966         Palmyrene Survey, Syria

Grants and awards (reverse chronological order) 
2021 Balzan Prize for Art and Archaeology of the Ancient Near East together with Giorgio Buccellati.
 2020           Europa Nostra ILUCIDARE prize
 2019           Between Syria and the Highlands. Studies in Honor of Giorgio Buccellati and Marilyn Kelly Buccellati                    
 2017           Research Medal from the Shanghai Archaeological Forum
 2013           Ahmanson Field Grants, Cotsen Institute of Archaeology, UCLA
 1999           Sabbatical, California State University, Los Angeles
 1997           (Spring) Creative Leave, California State University, Los Angeles
 1994–95      Sabbatical, California State University, Los Angeles
 1976–2020  Excavation grants from the National Endowment for the Humanities, The Ambassador International Cultural Foundation,             Catholic Biblical Association, Kress Foundation, Ahmanson Foundation, Skaggs Foundation, National Geographic Society, San Carlos Foundation.
 1987–94      Principal Investigator, National Endowment for the Humanities Division of Research (RO-21543-87) for The Mozan                          Archaeological Project.
 1987–88      Panelist for NEH to select grantees for Old World Archaeology.

Main publications (selection in reverse chronological order) 

 2020: “Continuity and Innovation at Urkesh in the ED III Period,” in M.E. Balza, P. Cotticelli-Kurras, L. d’Alfonso, M. Giorgieri, F. Giusfredi and A. Rizza (eds), Città e parole, argilla e pietra. Studi offerti a Clelia Mora da allievi, colleghi e amici, Biblioteca di Athenaeum 65, Bari: EDIPUGLIA, pp. 295–310.
 2020: “Sifting or Not: Research on the Effectiveness of Sifting,” in Nadja Cholidis, Elisabeth Katzy and Sabina Kulemann-Ossen (eds), Zwischen Ausgrabung und Ausstellung, Beiträge zur Archäologie Vorderasiens. Festschrift für Lutz Martin, marru: Studien zur Vorderasiatischen Archäologie 9, Münster: Zaphon, pp. 259–266.  
 2020: “Archaeological Digital Narratives: The Case of Urkesh Ceramics,” in Alexander Ahrens, Dörte Rokitta-Krumnow, Franziska Bloch and Claudia Bührig (eds), Drawing the Threads Together, Studies on Archaeology in Honour of Karin Bartl, marru: Studien zur Vorderasiatischen Archäologie 10, Münster: Zaphon, pp. 379–398 (with Giorgio Buccellati).
 2020: “The Urkesh Mittani Horizon: Ceramic Evidence,” in Michele Cammarosano et al. (eds), talugaesh wittesh. Ancient Near  Eastern Studies presented to Stefano de Martino, Kasion. Publikationen zur ostmediterranen Antike/Publications on Eastern Mediterranean Antiquity 2, Münster: Zaphon, pp. 237–256.
 2019: “Images of Work in Urkesh,” in Marta D’Andrea, Maria Gabriella Micale, Davide Nadali, Sara Pizzimenti and Agnese Vacca (eds), Pearls of the Past. Studies on Near Eastern Art and Archaeology in Honour of Frances Pinnock, marru, Studies in Near and Middle Eastern Archaeology 8, Münster: Zaphon, pp. 413–428
 2019: “Urkesh Ceramic Evidence for Function,” in A. Pieńkowska, D. Szeląg and I. Zych (eds), Stories told around the fountain. Papers offered to Piotr Bieliński on the occasion of his 70th birthday, Warsaw: University of Warsaw Press; PCMA UW., pp. 285–304.
 2019: “Emulation as a Strategy of Urkesh Potters and its Long Term Consequences,” Sh. N. Amirov (ed.), Caucasian Mountains and Mesopotamian Steppe. Festschrift for R. M. Munchaev, Moscow: ИАРАН, pp. 355–61.
 2018: “Urkesh Insights into Kura-Araxes Social Interaction” in Atilla Batmaz, Giorgi Bedianashvili, Aleksandra Michalewicz and Abby Robinson (eds), Context and Connection: Essays on the Archaeology of the Ancient Near East in Honour of Antonio Sagona, Orientalia Lovanensia Analecta 268, Leuven, Paris, Bristol (CT): Peeters, pp. 107–123.
 2016: Georgia Paese d’oro e di fede. Identità e alterità nella storia di un popolo, Firenze: Società editrice fiorentina, 128 pp.
 2016: “Urkesh: The Morphology and Cultural Landscape of the Hurrian Sacred,” in Paolo Matthiae (ed.), L’Archeologia del sacro e l’archeologia del culto, Accademia Nazionale dei Lincei: Atti dei convegni Lincei 304, Roma: Bardi Edizioni, pp. 99–113.
 2016: “Women's Power and Work in Ancient Urkesh” in S.L. Budin and J.M. Turfa (eds), Women in Antiquity: Real Women across the Ancient World, London, New York: Routledge, pp. 48–63.
 2016: “The Urkesh Ceramics Digital Book,” in Paola Corò et al. (eds), Libiamo ne’ lieti calici. Ancient Near Eastern Studies Presented to Lucio Milano on the Occasion of his 65th Birthday by Pupils, Colleagues and Friends, Münster: Ugarit-Verlag, pp. 721–734.
 2015: “Power and Identity Construction in Ancient Urkesh,” in Paola Ciafardoni and Deborah Giannessi (eds), From the Treasures of Syria. Essays on Art and Archaeology in Honour of Stefania Mazzoni, Leiden: Nederlands Inst. voor het Nabije Oosten, pp. 111–130.
 2013: “Landscape and Spatial Organization: An Essay on Early Urban Settlement Patterns in Urkesh,” in Dominik Bonatz and Lutz Martin (eds), 100 Jahre archäologische Feldforschungen in Nordost-Syrien – Eine Bilanz, Wiesbaden: Harrassowitz, pp. 149–166.
 2012: “Apprenticeship and Learning from the Ancestors: The Case of Ancient Urkesh,” in Willeke Wendrich (ed.), Archaeology and Apprenticeship: Body Knowledge, Identity, and Communities of Practice, Tucson: University of Arizona Press, pp. 203–223.
 2010: “Mozan/Urkesh in the Late Chalcolithic Period,” in Jörg Becker, Ralph Hempelmann, and Ellen Rehm (eds), Kulturlandschaft Syrien: Zentrum und Peripherie. Festschrift für Jan-Waalke Meyer, Alter Orient und Alten Testament 371, Münster: Ugarit-Verlag, pp. 87–121.
 2009: “Uqnitum and Tar’am-Agade, Patronage and Portraiture at Urkesh,” in J.C. Finke (ed.), Festschrift für Gernot Wilhelm anläßlich seines 65. Geburtstagesam 28. Januar 2010, Dresden: ISLET, pp. 185–202.
 2006: “Gilgamesh at Urkesh? Literary Motifs and Iconographic Identifications,” in P. Butterlin, M. Lebeau, J.-Y. Montchambert, J. L. Mntero Fenollós and B. Muller (eds), Les Espaces Syro-Mésopotamiens. Dimensions de l’experience humaine au Proche-Orient ancient. Volume d’hommage offert à Jean-Claude Margueron, Subartu 17, Turnhout: Brepols, pp. 403–414.
 2005: “Urkesh and the North: Recent Discoveries,” Studies on the Civilization and Culture of Nuzi and the Hurrians 15, Winona Lake, Ind.: Eisenbrauns, pp. 29–40.
 2004: “Andirons at Urkesh: New Evidence for the Hurrian Identity of Early Transcaucasian Culture,” in A. Sagona (ed.), A View from the Highlands: Archaeological Studies in Honour of Charles Burney, ANES Supplemet 2, Herent: Peeters, pp. 67–89.
 2003: “Ein hurritischer Gang in die Unterwelt,” Mitteilungen der Deutschen Orient-Gesellschaft 134, pp. 131–148.
 2002: “Tar’am-Agade, Daughter of Naram-Sin, at Urkesh,” in L. Al-Gailani, J. Curtis, H. Martin, A. McMahon, J. Oates and J. Reade (eds), Of Pots and Plans. Papers on the Archaeology and History of Mesopotamia and Syria presented to David Oates in Honour of his 75th Birthday, London: Nabu Publications, pp. 11–31 (with Giorgio Buccellati).

References 

Year of birth missing (living people)
Living people
Place of birth missing (living people)
American archaeologists
American women archaeologists
University of Chicago alumni
Saint Elizabeth University alumni
California State University, Los Angeles faculty
University of California, Los Angeles faculty